Astynome (Ancient Greek: Αστυνόμη) was the name which may refer to one of the following characters in Greek mythology:

Astynome, one of the Niobids.
Astynome, daughter of Talaus and mother of Capaneus by Hipponous.
Astynome, commonly referred to by the patronymic Chryseis.
Astynome, mother by Ares of Calydon who saw Artemis naked and was transformed into a rock by the goddess.

Notes

References 

 Gaius Julius Hyginus, Fabulae from The Myths of Hyginus translated and edited by Mary Grant. University of Kansas Publications in Humanistic Studies. Online version at the Topos Text Project.
 Homer, The Iliad with an English Translation by A.T. Murray, Ph.D. in two volumes. Cambridge, MA., Harvard University Press; London, William Heinemann, Ltd. 1924. . Online version at the Perseus Digital Library.
Homer, Homeri Opera in five volumes. Oxford, Oxford University Press. 1920. . Greek text available at the Perseus Digital Library.
Lucius Mestrius Plutarchus, Morals translated from the Greek by several hands. Corrected and revised by. William W. Goodwin, PH. D. Boston. Little, Brown, and Company. Cambridge. Press Of John Wilson and son. 1874. 5. Online version at the Perseus Digital Library.

Princesses in Greek mythology
Women of Ares
Mortal parents of demigods in classical mythology
Metamorphoses into inanimate objects in Greek mythology
Argive characters in Greek mythology